The Blue Legion, officially called the Spanish Volunteer Legion, was a volunteer legion created from 2,133 falangist volunteers who remained behind at the Eastern Front after most of the Spanish Blue Division was withdrawn in October 1943 because Francisco Franco had started negotiations with the Allies. It officially consisted of two battalions. It was later estimated that the legion grew to over 3,000 Spaniards.

A certain number of Spanish volunteers refused to return to Spain and remained on the Eastern Front, integrated into different German units. Some of them would continue to fight until the end of World War II. The 101st SS Spanish Volunteer Company of 140 men, composed of four rifle platoons and one staff platoon, was attached to the 28th SS Volunteer Grenadier Division Wallonien (the Walloon Legion) and fought against the Soviets in Pomerania and Brandenburg. Under the command of Miguel Ezquerra, remnants of the legion defended Berlin against an overwhelming Soviet assault from April-May 1945. They fought in and around the central government district of Berlin (Zitadelle sector), which included the Reich Chancellery and the Reichstag, being among the last defenders of the Führerbunker. 

The troops bore the word ESPAÑA and a red/yellow/yellow/red horizontally striped shield worn on the upper right arm, and a helmet.

References

Foreign volunteer units of the Wehrmacht
Military units and formations established in 1943
Military units and formations disestablished in 1944
Expatriate military units and formations
Military units and formations of the Soviet–German War
Military history of Spain